The 2018–19 Myanmar Women's League (also known as the KBZ Bank Myanmar Women's League for sponsorship reasons) was the 3rd season of the Myanmar Women's League, the top Myanmar professional league for women's association football clubs, since its establishment in 2016. A total of 8 teams competed in the league, with the season beginning on 3 December 2018.

Myawady were the defending champions, having won the Myanmar Women's League title the previous season.

League table

Below is the league table for 2018–19 season.

Matches
Fixtures and Results of the 2018–19 Women League season.

Week 1

Week 2

Week 3

Week 4

Week 5

Week 6

Week 7

Week 8

Week 9

Week 3

Week 4

Week 5

Week 6

Week 7

Season statistics

Top scorers
As of 18 January 2019.

See also
 2019 Myanmar National League
 2019 MNL-2

References

Women's football leagues in Myanmar
Myanmar